Ventura Farms, previously known as Deerwood Stock Farm and Kentucky Park Farms, lies in the Hidden Valley in Thousand Oaks, California. The  ranch has been featured in a number of Western films and is still used for filming.  The main activity has long been the raising of thoroughbred horses. It is situated at the east end of Lake Sherwood near the entrance to the Hidden Valley.

The ranch consists of various gardens, such as an English Garden, Family Garden, Secret Garden, Arabian Division, etc. Also at the farm is a herd of Santa Gertrudis cattle, Kashmir sheep, Reindeer, Arabian horses, and around 800 Koi. Architectural features include the Sound of Water Pavilion, Japanese Tea House, Chinese Scholar House, Poet’s House, and an  conservatory housing 25,000 orchids.

The Deerwood Stock Farm was owned by J.C. Dellinger from prior to 1944 until 1978, when David Murdock, CEO of Dole Corporation purchased it and renamed it Ventura Farms. The ranch may have been started by F. W. Matthiessen and given the original name Kentucky Park Farms. It was then property of Carleton F. Burke, California Horse Racing Board’s first chairman.

In motion pictures and television
It was under Dellinger’s ownership that movies were first shot on the ranch. It has been featured in films and TV-series such as:
Movies
 In Old Kentucky (1935)
 Under Fiesta Stars (1941)
 San Fernando Valley (1944)
 My Pal Trigger (1946)
 Trail to San Antone (1947)
 The Paleface (1948)
 Never a Dull Moment (1950)
 Sons of New Mexico (1950)
Television
 The X-Files (2001 episode The Gift)
 24 (TV Series) (2006)
 Agents of S.H.I.E.L.D. (2013-2020)
 Crisis (2014)
 Westworld (2016-)
 9-1-1 LoneStar (2021)

References

External links
 Official websites

Buildings and structures in Ventura County, California
History of Ventura County, California
Culture of Thousand Oaks, California
Horse farms in the United States
Movie ranches
Ranches in California
Cinema of Southern California
Economy of Ventura County, California